La caduta de' giganti (The Fall of the Giants) is an opera by the composer Christoph Willibald Gluck. It takes the form of a dramma per musica in two acts. The Italian-language libretto is by Francesco Vanneschi. The opera premiered on 7 January 1746 at the King's Theatre, Haymarket in London.

Sources
Holden, Amanda The Viking Opera Guide (Viking, 1993), page 371.

1746 operas
Italian-language operas
Operas by Christoph Willibald Gluck
Operas
Operas based on classical mythology